CodeX: The Stanford Center for Legal Informatics is a research center at Stanford University focused on the application of technology to law, and is jointly operated by Stanford Law School and Stanford University School of Engineering.  It is also informally known as "The Stanford CodeX Center" or simply "CodeX."

The center was one of the first interdisciplinary university research centers in the United States jointly operated by a computer science department and law school that is focused on using technology to improve the legal system.   The center is known for its research on Computational Law, Computable Contracts, the application of artificial intelligence to law, and other legal-technology innovations.   It holds a yearly academic conference entitled "Futurelaw."

The Stanford CodeX center is not to be confused with the Stanford Center for Internet and Society ("CIS").  The CIS is primarily focused on technology policy, whereas the CodeX center primarily focused upon researching and building legal technology.

Mission  
CodeX's mission is to employ a multidisciplinary approach to addressing problems in the law by applying computer science technologies, methods, and theories to legal problems.

Stanford University
Computer law organizations

History 
The center was founded in 2006 by Professor Michael Genesereth, Dr. Roland Vogl, Professor Harry Surden and Attorney Joshua Walker, at Stanford University.  

The Codex Center was originally called "Codex: The Stanford Center for Computers and the Law" and was renamed to "Codex: The Stanford Center for Legal Informatics" in 2016.

References